The Latin phrase  (meaning "outside the Church [there is] no salvation" or "no salvation outside the Church") is a phrase referring to a Christian doctrine about who is to receive salvation. 

The expression comes from the writings of Saint Cyprian of Carthage, a Christian bishop of the 3rd century. The phrase is an axiom often used as shorthand for the doctrine that the Church is necessary for salvation. It is a dogma in the Catholic Church and the Eastern Orthodox Church, in reference to their own communions. It is also held by many historic Protestant churches. However, Protestants, Catholics and the Eastern Orthodox each have a unique ecclesiological understanding of what constitutes 'the Church'. For some, the church is defined as "all those who will be saved", with no emphasis on the visible church. For others, the theological basis for this doctrine is founded on the beliefs that Jesus Christ personally established the one Church, and that the Church serves as the means by which the graces won by Christ are communicated to believers.

Scriptural foundation
The doctrine is based largely on Mark 16:15-16:

History

First appearance 
The original phrase,  ("there is no salvation outside the Church"), comes from Letter LXXII of Cyprian of Carthage (died 258). The letter was written in reference to a particular controversy as to whether it was necessary to baptize applicants who had been previously baptized by heretics. In , Cyprian tells Jubaianus of his conviction that baptism conferred by heretics is not valid. Firmilian (died ) agreed with Cyprian, reasoning that those who are outside the Church and do not have the Holy Spirit cannot admit others to the Church or give what they do not possess.

Writing while still a cardinal, Pope Benedict XVI (died 2022) commented that Cyprian was not expressing a theory on the eternal fate of all baptized and non-baptized persons.

Early Church Fathers

The concept was also referred to by Origen in his Homilies on Joshua, but neither he nor Cyprian were addressing non-Christians, but those already baptized and in danger of leaving the faith, as that would involve apostasy. Earlier, Justin Martyr had indicated that the righteous Jews who lived before Christ would be saved. He later expressed a similar opinion concerning Gentiles. Those who act pleasing to God, while not "being" Christian are yet in some sense "in" Christ the Logos....Each one, ... shall be saved by his own righteousness, ... those who regulated their lives by the law of Moses would in like manner be saved. ...Since those who did that which is universally, naturally, and eternally good are pleasing to God, they shall be saved through this Christ in the resurrection equally with those righteous men who were before them, namely Noah, and Enoch, and Jacob, and whoever else there be, along with those who have known this Christ.

Irenaeus (died 202 AD) wrote: "One should not seek among others the truth that can be easily gotten from the Church. For in her, as in a rich treasury, the apostles have placed all that pertains to truth, so that everyone can drink this beverage of life. She is the door of life" (Irenaeus of Lyons, Against Heresies, III.4). However, he also said: "For it was not merely for those who believed on Him in the time of Tiberius Caesar that Christ came, nor did the Father exercise His providence for the men only who are now alive, but for all men altogether, who from the beginning, according to their capacity, in their generation have both feared and loved God, and practised justice and piety towards their neighbours, and have earnestly desired to see Christ, and to hear His voice." Irenaeus recognized that all who feared and loved God, practiced justice and piety toward their neighbors, and desired to see Christ, insofar as they were able to do so, would be saved. Since many were not able to have an explicit desire to see Christ, but only an implicit one, Iranaeus held the view that this would be satisfactory for salvation.

Gregory of Nazianzus took a rather broad view in his understanding of membership in the body of Christ. In the funeral oration for his father's death in 374, Gregory stated: "He was ours even before he was of our fold. His manner of life made him one of us. Just as there are many of our own who are not with us, whose lives alienate them from the common body, so too there are many of those outside who belong really to us, men whose devout conduct anticipates their faith. They lack only the name of that which in fact they possess. My father was one of these, an alien shoot but inclined to us in his manner of life." In other words, by their charity of life, they are united to Christians in Christ, even before they explicitly believe in Christ. Fulgentius of Ruspe took a much stricter view: "Most firmly hold and never doubt that not only pagans, but also all Jews, all heretics, and all schismatics who finish this life outside of the Catholic Church, will go into the eternal fire prepared for the devil and his angels."

Jerome wrote: "This is the ark of Noah, and he who is not found in it shall perish when the flood prevails." Bede continues this theme: "And according to this sense the ark is manifestly the Church, Noah the Lord who builds the Church." Thomas Aquinas, Peter Canisius and Robert Bellarmine also used the image of the life-saving ark as a representation of the Church.

Augustine of Hippo made numerous remarks in response to adversaries, often on opposite sides of this issue, once saying: "Whoever is without the Church will not be reckoned among the sons, and whoever does not want to have the Church as mother will not have God as father." He could also pick up on the sayings of the Fathers, and be completely inclusive in his assessment: "All together we are members of Christ and are his body ... throughout the world ... from Abel the just until the end of time ... whoever among the just made his passage throughout this life, whether now ... or in the generations to come, all the just are this one body of Christ, and individually his members."

Other views

Novatian (200–258) says that the church is not for salvation, but that is a congregation of saints.

Eastern Orthodox
Kallistos Ware, a Greek Eastern Orthodox bishop, expressed this doctrine as follows:

Roman Catholic

The 1992 Catechism of the Catholic Church explained this as "all salvation comes from Christ the Head through the Church which is His Body." The Catholic Church also teaches that the doctrine does not mean that everyone who is not visibly within the Church is necessarily damned in case of inculpable ignorance. Some of the Catholic expressions of this dogma are: the profession of faith of Pope Innocent III (1208), the profession of faith of the Fourth Lateran Council (1215), the papal bull  of Pope Boniface VIII (1302), and the profession of faith of the Council of Florence (1442).

 Pope Pelagius II (died 590): "Consider the fact that whoever has not been in the peace and unity of the Church cannot have the Lord...Although given over to flames and fires, they burn, or, thrown to wild beasts, they lay down their lives, there will not be (for them) that crown of faith but the punishment of faithlessness. …Such a one can be slain, he cannot be crowned. …[If] slain outside the Church, he cannot attain the rewards of the Church."
Pope Gregory XVI later quoted his predecessor in his 1832 encyclical  ("on mixed religious marriages").
Pope Leo XII, ( #14, May 5, 1824): "It is impossible for the most true God, who is Truth itself, the best, the wisest Provider, and the Rewarder of good men, to approve all sects who profess false teachings which are often inconsistent with one another and contradictory, and to confer eternal rewards on their members… by divine faith we hold one Lord, one faith, one baptism, and that no other name under heaven is given to men except the name of Jesus Christ of Nazareth in which we must be saved. This is why we profess that there is no salvation outside the Church."
Bishop John Carroll (died 1815), the first bishop in the United States, recognized a distinction between being in communion with the Church and being a member thereof:To be in the communion of the Catholic Church and to be a member of the Church are two different things. They are in the communion of profession of her faith and participation of her sacraments, through the ministry and government of her lawful pastors. The members of the Catholic Church are all those who with a sincere heart seek the true religion and are in unfeigned disposition to embrace the truth wherever they find it. It never was our doctrine that salvation can be obtained only by the former. Carroll traces this analysis back to Augustine of Hippo.
Francis Cardinal Bourne, Archbishop of Westminster from 1903–1935, summarized the Church teaching as follows:If God the Creator speaks, the creature is bound to listen and to believe what He utters. Hence the axiom "outside the Church there is no salvation". But, as it is equally true that without the deliberate act of the will there can be neither fault nor sin, so evidently this axiom applies only to those who are outside the Church knowingly, deliberately, and wilfully. …And this is the doctrine of the Catholic Church on this often misunderstood and misrepresented aphorism. There are the covenanted and the uncovenanted dealings of God with His creatures, and no creature is outside His fatherly care. There are millions – even at this day the vast majority of mankind – who are still unreached or unaffected by the message of Christianity in any shape or form. There are large numbers who are persuaded that the old covenant still prevails and are perfectly sincere and conscientious in their observance of the Jewish Law. And there are millions who accept some fashion of Christian teaching who have never adverted to the idea of Unity as I have described it, and have no thought that they are obliged in conscience to accept the teaching and to submit to the authority of the Catholic Church. All such, whether separated wholly from acceptance of Christ and His teaching, or accepting that teaching only to the extent in which they have perceived it, will be judged on their own merits.

Councils
 Fourth Lateran Council (1215): "There is but one universal Church of the faithful, outside which no one at all is saved."
 Council of Florence, Cantate Domino (1441): "The most Holy Roman Church firmly believes, professes and preaches that none of those existing outside the Catholic Church, not only pagans, but also Jews and heretics and schismatics, can have a share in life eternal; but that they will go into the 'eternal fire which was prepared for the devil and his angels' (Matthew 25:41), unless before death they are joined with Her; and that so important is the unity of this ecclesiastical body that only those remaining within this unity can profit by the sacraments of the Church unto salvation, and they alone can receive an eternal recompense for their fasts, their almsgivings, their other works of Christian piety and the duties of a Christian soldier. No one, let his almsgiving be as great as it may, no one, even if he pour out his blood for the Name of Christ, can be saved, unless he remain within the bosom and the unity of the Catholic Church." The same council also ruled that those who die in original sin, but without mortal sin, will also find punishment in hell, but unequally: "But the souls of those who depart this life in actual mortal sin, or in original sin alone, go down straightaway to hell to be punished, but with unequal pains."

Encyclicals
Pope Boniface VIII's bull  of 1302 was promulgated during an ongoing dispute between Boniface VIII and Philip IV of France. In it, Boniface declared, "We are compelled in virtue of our faith to believe and maintain that there is only one holy Catholic Church, and that one is apostolic. This we firmly believe and profess without qualification. Outside this Church there is no salvation and no remission of sins." The bull notably extends what had been ecclesiastical dictum into relations with temporal powers. According to Robert W. Dyson, there are some who hold that Giles of Rome might have been the actual writer of the bull. It is notable for the claim, "We declare, say, define, and pronounce that it is absolutely necessary for the salvation of every human creature to be subject to the Roman Pontiff."

Pope Leo XII in his 1824 encyclical  in discussing religious indifferentism, said: "A certain sect, which you surely know, has unjustly arrogated to itself the name of philosophy, and has aroused from the ashes the disorderly ranks of practically every error. Under the gentle appearance of piety and liberality this sect professes what they call tolerance or indifferentism. It preaches that not only in civil affairs, which is not Our concern here, but also in religion, God has given every individual a wide freedom to embrace and adopt without danger to his salvation whatever sect or opinion appeals to him on the basis of his private judgment."

Pope Pius IX wrote a number of times against religious indifferentism. In the 1863 encyclical  he said, "And here, beloved Sons and Venerable Brothers, We should mention again and censure a very grave error in which some Catholics are unhappily engaged, who believe that men living in error, and separated from the true faith and from Catholic unity, can attain eternal life. Indeed, this is certainly quite contrary to Catholic teaching. It is known to Us and to you that they who labor in invincible ignorance of our most holy religion and who, zealously keeping the natural law and its precepts engraved in the hearts of all by God, and being ready to obey God, live an honest and upright life, can, by the operating power of divine light and grace, attain eternal life, since God who clearly beholds, searches, and knows the minds, souls, thoughts, and habits of all men, because of His great goodness and mercy, will by no means suffer anyone to be punished with eternal torment who has not the guilt of deliberate sin. But, the Catholic dogma that no one can be saved outside the Catholic Church is well-known; and also that those who are obstinate toward the authority and definitions of the same Church, and who persistently separate themselves from the unity of the Church, and from the Roman Pontiff, the successor of Peter, to whom 'the guardianship of the vine has been entrusted by the Savior' (Council of Chalcedon, Letter to Pope Leo I) cannot obtain eternal salvation..."

Pope Pius XI saw the ecumenical movement of the early 20th century "as nothing else than a Federation, composed of various communities of Christians, even though they adhere to different doctrines, which may even be incompatible one with another." In his 1928 encyclical , he quotes from Lactantius: "The Catholic Church alone is keeping the true worship. This is the font of truth, this is the house of faith, this is the temple of God; if any man enter not here, or if any man go forth from it, he is a stranger to the hope of life and salvation. …Furthermore, in this one Church of Christ, no man can be or remain who does not accept, recognize and obey the authority and supremacy of Peter and his legitimate successors."

Second Vatican Council

In calling the Second Vatican Council, Pope John XXIII noted a distinction between the truths of faith and how those truths are conveyed. In the 1973 declaration , the Congregation for the Doctrine of the Faith recognized that the articulation of revealed truth would necessarily be influenced by historical factors.

The Second Vatican Council declared that the Christian communities that are not in full communion, but only in "partial communion" with the Catholic Church, "though we believe them to be deficient in some respects, have been by no means deprived of significance and importance in the mystery of salvation. For the Spirit of Christ has not refrained from using them as means of salvation which derive their efficacy from the very fullness of grace and truth entrusted to the Church." It explained that "some and even very many of the significant elements and endowments which together go to build up and give life to the Church itself, can exist outside the visible boundaries of the Catholic Church: the written word of God; the life of grace; faith, hope and charity, with the other interior gifts of the Holy Spirit, and visible elements too. All of these, which come from Christ and lead back to Christ, belong by right to the one Church of Christ."

These elements, it said, "as gifts belonging to the Church of Christ, are forces impelling toward Catholic unity." The Council identified Christ's Church on earth with the Catholic Church, saying: "This Church constituted and organized in the world as a society, subsists in the Catholic Church." The Congregation for the Doctrine of the Faith stated in a later doctrinal note that the term "subsistit in" and "is" are interchangeable, so that the "one true Church" is and subsists in the Catholic Church, according to Catholic teaching. The Second Vatican Council also declared that "it is through Christ's Catholic Church alone, which is the universal help towards salvation, that the fullness of the means of salvation can be obtained. It was to the apostolic college alone, of which Peter is the head, that we believe that our Lord entrusted all the blessings of the New Covenant, in order to establish on earth the one body of Christ into which all those must be fully incorporated who belong in any way to the people of God."

In its decree on missionary activity, the Council, quoting , 14, said: "Christ Himself 'by stressing in express language the necessity of faith and baptism (cf. Mark 16:16; John 3:5), at the same time confirmed the necessity of the Church, into which men enter by baptism, as by a door....' Therefore though God in ways known to Himself can lead those inculpably ignorant of the Gospel to find that faith without which it is impossible to please Him, yet a necessity lies upon the Church, and at the same time a sacred duty, to preach the Gospel."

The Council also warned that full incorporation in the Church does not ensure salvation: "They are fully incorporated in the society of the Church who, possessing the Spirit of Christ accept her entire system and all the means of salvation given to her, and are united with her as part of her visible bodily structure and through her with Christ, who rules her through the Supreme Pontiff and the bishops. The bonds which bind men to the Church in a visible way are profession of faith, the sacraments, and ecclesiastical government and communion. He is not saved, however, who, though part of the body of the Church, does not persevere in charity. He remains indeed in the bosom of the Church, but, as it were, only in a 'bodily' manner and not 'in his heart'. All the Church's children should remember that their exalted status is to be attributed not to their own merits but to the special grace of Christ. If they fail moreover to respond to that grace in thought, word and deed, not only shall they not be saved but they will be the more severely judged."<ref name=AG14>Lumen gentium, 14</ref>

 Second Vatican Council, Dogmatic Constitution , 14: "They could not be saved who, knowing that the Catholic Church was founded as necessary by God through Christ, would refuse either to enter it, or to remain in it."
 Second Vatican Council, Dogmatic Constitution , 16: "Nor is God far distant from those who in shadows and images seek the unknown God, for it is He who gives to all men life and breath and all things, and as Saviour wills that all men be saved. Those also can attain to salvation who through no fault of their own do not know the Gospel of Christ or His Church, yet sincerely seek God and moved by grace strive by their deeds to do His will as it is known to them through the dictates of conscience. Nor does Divine Providence deny the helps necessary for salvation to those who, without blame on their part, have not yet arrived at an explicit knowledge of God and with His grace strive to live a good life."

The Catechism of the Catholic Church states that the phrase, "Outside the Church there is no salvation", means, if put in positive terms, that "all salvation comes from Christ the Head through the Church which is his Body", and it "is not aimed at those who, through no fault of their own, do not know Christ and his Church".

At the same time, it adds: "Although in ways known to himself God can lead those who, through no fault of their own, are ignorant of the Gospel to that faith without which it is impossible to please him, the Church still has the obligation and also the sacred right to evangelize all men."

The Church has also declared that "she is joined in many ways to the baptized who are honored by the name of Christian, but do not profess the Catholic faith in its entirety or have not preserved unity or communion under the successor of Peter", and that "those who have not yet received the Gospel are related to the People of God in various ways."

  

The 2000 declaration  of the Congregation for the Doctrine of the Faith states that "it must be firmly believed that the Church, a pilgrim now on earth, is necessary for salvation: the one Christ is the mediator and the way of salvation; he is present to us in his body which is the Church. He himself explicitly asserted the necessity of faith and baptism (cf. Mk 16:16; Jn 3:5), and thereby affirmed at the same time the necessity of the Church which men enter through baptism as through a door." It then adds that "for those who are not formally and visibly members of the Church, salvation in Christ is accessible by virtue of a grace which, while having a mysterious relationship to the Church, does not make them formally part of the Church, but enlightens them in a way which is accommodated to their spiritual and material situation. This grace comes from Christ; it is ... communicated by the Holy Spirit; it has a relationship with the Church, which, according to the plan of the Father, has her origin in the mission of the Son and the Holy Spirit."

Inculpable ignorance

In its statements regarding this doctrine, the Church expressly teaches that "it is necessary to hold for certain that they who labor in ignorance of the true religion, if this ignorance is invincible, will not be held guilty of this in the eyes of God"; that "outside of the Church, nobody can hope for life or salvation unless he is excused through ignorance beyond his control"; and that "they who labor in invincible ignorance of our most holy religion and who, zealously keeping the natural law and its precepts engraved in the hearts of all by God, and being ready to obey God, live an honest and upright life, can, by the operating power of divine light and grace, attain eternal life.""Inculpable or invincible ignorance has never been and will never be a means of salvation. To be saved, it is necessary to be justified, or to be in the state of sanctifying grace. To obtain sanctifying grace, it is necessary to have the proper dispositions for justification; that is, true divine faith in at least the necessary truths of salvation, confident hope in the divine Savior, sincere sorrow for sin, together with the firm purpose of doing all that God has commanded, etc. Now, these supernatural acts of faith, hope, charity, contrition, etc., which prepare the soul for receiving sanctifying grace, can never be supplied by invincible ignorance;... But if we say that inculpable ignorance cannot save a man, we thereby do not say that invincible ignorance damns a man. Far from it. To say, invincible ignorance is no means of salvation, is one thing; and to say, invincible ignorance is the cause of damnation, is another. To maintain the latter would be wrong, for inculpable ignorance of the fundamental principles of faith excuses a heathen from the sin of infidelity, and a Protestant from the sin of heresy; because such invincible ignorance, being only a simple involuntary privation, is no sin." (Michael Müller, Invincible or Inculpable Ignorance Neither Saves nor Damns a Person, Questions and Answers on Salvation by Rev. Michael Muller, C.SS.R)

 Strict interpretation 

Some sedevacantists called Feeneyists (such as the Slaves of the Immaculate Heart of Mary of New Hampshire) believe that only baptized Catholics can be saved. They reject of concept of baptism by desire and baptism of blood, and say that only a properly performed rite with the use of water and the requisite words is sufficient.

Other or related views

 Lutheran interpretation 

Martin Luther, the foremost leader of the Protestant Reformation, spoke of the necessity of belonging to the church (in the sense of what he saw as the true church) in order to be saved:

Therefore he who would find Christ must first find the Church. How should we know where Christ and his faith were, if we did not know where his believers are? And he who would know anything of Christ must not trust himself nor build a bridge to heaven by his own reason; but he must go to the Church, attend and ask her. Now the Church is not wood and stone, but the company of believing people; one must hold to them, and see how they believe, live and teach; they surely have Christ in their midst. For outside of the Christian church there is no truth, no Christ, no salvation.

Modern Lutheran churches "do agree with the traditional statement that 'outside the catholic church there is no salvation', but this statement refers not to the Roman organization but to the Holy Christian Catholic and Apostolic Church, which consists of all who believe in Christ as their Savior."

 Reformed interpretation 

The Genevan reformer John Calvin, in his Reformation-era work Institutes of the Christian Religion, wrote: "beyond the pale of the Church no forgiveness of sins, no salvation, can be hoped for". Calvin wrote also that "those to whom He is a Father, the Church must also be a mother," echoing the words of the originator of the Latin phrase himself, Cyprian: "He can no longer have God for his Father who has not the Church for his mother."

Reformed scholastics accepted the phrase so long as the church is recognized by the marks of the church, which they defined as proper administration of the Word and sacrament, rather than apostolic succession.

The idea is further affirmed in the Westminster Confession of Faith of 1647 that "the visible Church [...] is the Kingdom of the Lord Jesus Christ, the house and family of God, out of which there is no ordinary possibility of salvation."

 Methodist interpretation 

The Methodist tradition, inclusive of the holiness movement, holds that the office of the keys is exercised when the Church baptizes an individual and pronounces them saved. The office of the keys is furthermore exercised in the Church "binding and loosing", being able to excommunicate individuals from the sacraments as "ordinarily, no one is saved outside the visible church". The purpose of this is to allow individuals to repent and come into full communion with the Church so that they might receive "final salvation".

See also

 
 Error has no rights
 Exclusivism
 Religious exclusivism
 

Notes

References

 Further reading 

 Sullivan SJ, Francis A., Salvation Outside the Church?: Tracing the History of the Catholic Response, Wipf and Stock Publishers, 2002. 
Jean de Caumont, S.J, The Firm Foundation of the Catholic ReligionLeonardus Lessius, A Consultation what Faith and Religion is Best to be Imbraced, 1609
Rev. William Smith, S.J., 1625
Bishop George Hay, No Salvation Outside The Catholic Church: An Inquiry, Whether Salvation Can Be Had Without True Faith, and out of the Communion of the Church of Christ'', 1822
Rev. Michael Müller, The Catholic Dogma: Extra Ecclesiam Nullus Omnino Salvatur, 1888
Kenneth J. Howell, "Can Non-Christians Be Saved?", Catholic Answers

Salvation in Catholicism
Catholic Church and ecumenism
Latin religious words and phrases
Christian terminology
Ecclesiology